Australasia was a combined team of athletes from Australia and the Dominion of New Zealand that competed together at the 1908 and 1912 Summer Olympics.  When the Olympic Games resumed in 1920 after World War I, the two nations sent separate teams to the Games, and have done so ever since.

Participation

Timeline of participation

Medal tables

Medals by Summer Games

Medals by sport

List of medalists 
The Australasia team won a total of twelve medals in the two Olympiads in which they competed, mostly in swimming. One New Zealander won a medal in 1908 (Harry Kerr a bronze in athletics), and two New Zealanders (Malcolm Champion a gold in swimming, Anthony Wilding a bronze in tennis) won medals in 1912; all other medalists for Australasia were Australians.

1 Rugby players who competed at the 1908 Games: Phil Carmichael, Charles Russell, Daniel Carroll, Jack Hickey, Frank Smith, Chris McKivat, Arthur McCabe, Thomas Griffen, Jumbo Barnett, Patrick McCue, Sydney Middleton, Tom Richards, Malcolm McArthur, Charles McMurtrie, Robert Craig

References

External links
 
 
 
 Medal Count for ANZ at DatabaseOlympics.com

 
 
Australia–New Zealand sports relations
Australasia